The Hyatt Regency Casablanca is a luxury hotel in the Old Medina of Casablanca, Morocco, located just to the west of Sheraton Casablanca Hotel & Towers. The hotel has a 255 rooms, including 223 deluxe king and twin rooms, 11 junior suites, 19 executive suites and 3 royal suites, and 8 conference rooms accommodating from 20 to 400 people. Its restaurants, such as Cafe M, Dar Beida, Bissat and the outdoor Les Bougainvillées cater in Moroccan, fusion or Parisian cuisine. Dar Beida is a traditional Moroccan restaurant resembling an Arab tent and Bissat is located under a Moorish dome.

The King Rooms cover 31 square metres with a Simmons Beautyrest luxe king bed with plush duvet, marble bath and other luxury furnishings. The hotel also has an outdoor pool, a sauna,  gym, two squash courts, a volleyball court, a basketball court and a hammam.

References

External links

Official site

Hotels in Casablanca
Hyatt Hotels and Resorts
Hotel buildings completed in 1973
Hotels in Morocco
20th-century architecture in Morocco